Ryan Henry (born 14 October 1984) is a former professional tennis player from Australia.

Henry had an eventful year as a junior in 2002. He and partner Todd Reid won the boys' doubles title at the 2002 Australian Open and they also finished runners-up in the 2002 French Open. In Wimbledon that year he created a tournament record when he defeated France's Clément Morel 26–24 in the final set. Constantly interrupted by rain, their encounter lasted three days. He lost to Richard Gasquet in the singles semi-finals of the 2002 US Open, unable to convert three match points.

The following year, he was given wildcard entry into the Australian Open and met Julian Knowle in the first round. He lost the match in four sets. In the men's doubles he was again paired with Reid and they were able to defeat Germans Karsten Braasch and Rainer Schüttler in the opening round. They were unable to get past top seeds Mark Knowles and Daniel Nestor in their next fixture.

Junior Grand Slam finals

Doubles: 2 (1 title, 1 runner-up)

ATP Challenger and ITF Futures finals

Doubles: 1 (1–0)

References

External links
 
 

1984 births
Living people
Australian male tennis players
Australian Open (tennis) junior champions
Tennis people from New South Wales
Grand Slam (tennis) champions in boys' doubles
21st-century Australian people